Andrea Bracaletti (born January 17, 1983) is an Italian footballer who plays as a midfielder for Serie D club AC Calvina Sport.

Biography
Bracaletti was born in Orvieto.

On 1 September 2008, he was sold to SPAL.

On 31 August 2010, he was sold to FeralpiSalò from SPAL.

On 22 May 2015 Bracaletti signed a new 2-year contract with FeralpiSalò.

On 31 January 2019 he was released from his contract with Triestina by mutual consent. On 17 June 2019, Bracaletti joined La Fiorita in San Marino. Bracaletti played both UEFA Europa League qualification games for the club in June and July against Andorran club UE Engordany. However, La Fiorita lost both games and Bracaletti left the club. He then joined Serie D club A.C. Calvina Sport on 19 August 2019.

References

External links
  Andrea Bracaletti's profile on U.S. Avellino's official website 
  

1983 births
Living people
People from Orvieto
Italian footballers
Association football midfielders
A.S.D. Victor San Marino players
A.C. Cesena players
U.S. Avellino 1912 players
U.S. Sassuolo Calcio players
S.P.A.L. players
A.S.D. Cassino Calcio 1924 players
FeralpiSalò players
U.S. Triestina Calcio 1918 players
S.P. La Fiorita players
Serie B players
Serie C players
Serie D players
Sportspeople from the Province of Terni
Footballers from Umbria